Symmes Valley High School (SVHS) is a public high school near Willow Wood in Lawrence County in Southern Ohio.  It is the only high school in the Symmes Valley Local School District.  Their nickname is the Vikings and the official school colors are Scarlet and Grey.  There are currently approximately 300 students in grades 9-12 at the school.

Brief history
Symmes Valley High School was created with the consolidation of Waterloo High School (Waterloo Wonders), Windsor High School, and Mason-Aid High School.  The first year of classes at the school began in 1961.  Although the main portion of the building was constructed in 1961, there have been several building modernization projects and additions.  Six additional classrooms were added to the school in 1975.  Then in 1994, a major renovation occurred during the construction of a new elementary building on the same campus.  During this renovation, all asbestos was removed from the building, a new heating and air conditioning system, new lights, new ceilings, and new windows were installed. At this time, a brand new band room was constructed at the rear of the building and the gym received new seating, a refurbishment of the floor, and new paint.  In 2003, another multimillion-dollar project was completed.  A new, state-of-the-art library and media center was constructed along with new offices, a new kitchen and cafeteria, and several new classrooms.  Also during this time, the hallways received new flooring, new lighting and ceilings again, all new interior doors, and painting.  The home economics classroom was also completely remodeled.  The gymnasium once again received new seating in the summer of 2007 along with a sanding and repainting of the gymnasium floor.

Athletics
The Vikings are members of the Southern Ohio Conference (SOC) and compete in baseball (boys), basketball (girls and boys), football (boys), softball (girls), and volleyball (girls).  According to the Ohio High School Athletic Association (OHSAA), the school is in Division VII for football and Division IV for baseball, basketball, softball, and volleyball.  These divisions are for the smallest schools in Ohio.

The S.O.C. includes teams from four different Ohio counties - Jackson County (Oak Hill High School), Lawrence County (Saint Joseph Central High School and Symmes Valley High School), Pike County (Waverly High School, Eastern High School, and Western High School), and Scioto County (Clay High School, Green High School, Glenwood High School, Sciotoville Community School, Valley High School, Northwest High School, Minford High School, Portsmouth West High School, Notre Dame High School, South Webster High School, and Wheelersburg High School).

See also Ohio High School Athletic Conferences and the Southern Ohio Conference

Ohio High School Athletic Association championships and appearances
Boys' Basketball (as Waterloo High School before consolidation, "Waterloo Wonders")
OHSAA State Championship
1934 - (d. Lowellville 43-32 & d. Mark Center 40-26)
1935 - (d. Fremont St. Joseph 48-21 & d. Oxford Stewart 25-22)
OHSAA Final Four Appearances (besides the championships)
1941
Girls' Softball - OHSAA State Runner-up - 2005 (d. Cortland Maplewood 3-2 & lost to Convoy Crestview 6-4 to finish season at 28-5)

Extracurricular activities
The school also offers various clubs and organizations including student council, Band, National Beta Club, Marching Vikings (Marching Band), FCCLA, Fellowship of Christian Athletes (FCA), Future Farmers of America (FFA), Spanish club, and drama club.

Notable alumni, coaches, and faculty
 Odie Estep - Ohio Softball Coaches' Hall of Fame (2007)

References

External links
 Symmes Valley Local School District

High schools in Lawrence County, Ohio
Public high schools in Ohio